The following list includes settlements, geographic features, and political subdivisions of Illinois whose names are derived from Native American languages.

Listings

State
 Illinois – from the French rendering of an Algonquian (perhaps Miami) word apparently meaning "s/he speaks normally" (c.f. Miami ilenweewa), from Proto-Algonquian *elen-, "ordinary" + -wē, "to speak", referring to the Illiniwek.

Counties

 Iroquois County – Named after the Iroquois Indian tribe.
 City of Iroquois
 Iroquois Township
 Iroquois River
 Iroquois County State Wildlife Area
 Macoupin County – Miami-Illinois term for the American lotus
 Macoupin Creek
 Peoria County – named after the Peoria Tribe which previously lived in the area
 City of East Peoria
 City of Peoria
 City of Peoria Heights
 City of West Peoria
 Sangamon County – from a Pottawatomie word Sain-guee-mon meaning "where there is plenty to eat."
 City of Sangamon
 Sangamon River
 Wabash County – The name "Wabash" is an English spelling of "Wabashike," (pronounced "Wah-bah-she-keh"), the Miami word for "pure white."
 City of Wabash Point
 Wabash River
 Little Wabash River
 Winnebago County
 Winnebago

Settlements

 Algonquin
 Aptakisic – named for Chief Optagushick of the Potawatomi tribe; means "Half Day," or "sun at the center of the sky"
 Ashkum – name originated from Chief Ashkum of the Potawatomi Indians
 Cahokia – refers to one of the clans of the historic Illini confederacy, who met early French explorers to the region
 Cahokia Township
 Chautauqua
 Chebanse – "Chebanse" derives from zhishibéns, meaning "the little duck" in the Potawatomi language
 Chebanse Township
 Chenoa
 Chicago – for the Miami-Illinois word Shikaakwa, wild leek.
 City of Chicago Heights
 Village of Chicago Ridge
 Chicago River
 Chillicothe – comes from the name of the Chalagawtha sept of the Shawnee nation
 Chillicothe Township
 Colusa
 Dakota
 Dakota Township
 Erie – named after Erie County, New York which in turn was named after Lake Erie. The lake was named by the Erie people, a Native American people who lived along its southern shore. The tribal name "erie" is a shortened form of the Iroquoian word erielhonan, meaning "long tail"
 Erie Township
 Village of Mount Erie
 Genesee – from the Iroquois word Genesee, meaning "shining valley" or "beautiful valley"
 Geneseo – "Geneseo" is a variation of the Iroquois word Genesee, meaning "shining valley" or "beautiful valley"
 Geneseo Township
 Half Day – named after Potawatomi Chief Aptakisic, the chief at the time the area was settled. The name, meaning "sun at meridian", was anglicized as "Half Day".
 Illini
 Illini State Park
 Illiopolis – The name was formed from Illinois and -polis, a Greek suffix meaning "city".
 Illiopolis Township
 Iuka – named after the Chickasaw Indian Chief Iuka
 Kansas – named by the French after the Kansas, Omaha, Kaw, Osage and Dakota Sioux Indian word "KaNze" meaning, in the Kansas language, "south wind."
 Kansas Township (Edgar County)
 Kansas Township (Woodford County)
 Kaskaskia – "Cascasquia" is an alternative, supposedly more French, spelling of "Kaskaskia" that is sometimes encountered. It was named after a clan of the Illiniwek encountered by the early French Jesuits and other settlers.
 Kaskaskia Township
 Kaskaskia River
 Kaskaskia River State Fish and Wildlife Area
 Kewanee – "Kewanee" is the Winnebago word for greater prairie chicken
 Kewanee Township
 Kickapoo – named after the Kickapoo people
 Kickapoo Township
 Mackinaw – Mackinaw (sometimes spelled Mackinac) is derived from the Ojibwe word mikinaak meaning "turtle".
 Mackinaw River
 Mackinaw River State Fish and Wildlife Area
 Little Mackinaw River
 Mahomet – after Mahomet Weyonomon, a tribal chieftain from Connecticut
 Maquon – from the Algonquian language A-ma-quon-sip-pi, Amaquon meaning mussel, or mussel shell
 Maroa – named after the Maroa Indians
 Mascoutah – a derivative of the Mascouten tribe.
 Mendota – The name "Mendota" is derived from a Native American word meaning "junction of two trails".
 Menominee – Named after the Menominee Indian tribe.
 Menominee River
 Little Menominee River
 Merrimac – name taken from the nearby Meramec River whose name was translated as 'Ugly Water' from Algonquian by French Jesuits in the area. However, scholars of the language translate it as 'place of strong current.'
 Mettawa – named for a nearby Potawatomi settlement
 Minonk – from the Ojibwe word meaning “a good place” or from the Mohican word meaning “high point”.
 Minooka
 Mokena – a name derived from a Native American language meaning "mud turtle"
 Moweaqua
 Nachusa
 Nachusa Township
 Nekoma
 Neoga – Neoga means "deer" in the Kickapoo language
 Neponset
 Nokomis
 Oconee – named after the daughter of a local Indian chieftain
 Ohio
 Okawville
 Omaha
 Oneco
 Oneida – named after the Oneida people
 Onarga
 Oquawka
 Oskaloosa
 Ottawa – named after the Odawa people
 Owaneco
 Panama
 Panola – a Native American word for cotton
 Patoka – named after a local Indian chieftain
 Pawnee – named after the Pawnee people
 Pecatonica – The word Pecatonica is an anglicization of two Algonquian language words; Bekaa (or Pekaa in some dialects), which means slow and niba, which means water; forming the conjunction Bekaaniba or Slow Water.
 Peotone – Derived from the Potawatomi language meaning "come here".
 Pesotum
 Pistakee Highlands – "pistakee" comes from the Algonquin word for buffalo
 Pocahontas – named after famous Native American Pochahontas.
 Ponemah
 Pontiac – named after Pontiac, an Odawa war chief 
 Pontoosuc
 Potomac – originally named Marysville after the wives of the two founders, John Smith and Isaac Meneley, who started businesses here circa 1840. On May 13, 1871, a post office was established at the town and was named Potomac, most likely after the Potomac River. The town's name was later changed to conform to this.
 Roanoke
 Sauk Village – named after the Sauk people
 Saunemin – named after a Kickapoo chief
 Scioto – The name Scioto is derived from the Wyandot word skɛnǫ·tǫ' meaning "deer"
 Scioto Mills
 Sciota Township
 Seneca
 Shabbona and Shabbona Grove – named after the Potawatomi chief and peacemaker Shabbona
 Shawneetown – named after the Shawnee people
 Old Shawneetown
 Shawnee National Forest
 Shokokon
 Skokie
 Somonauk
 Tamaroa – named after the Tamaroa, an Illiniwek people
 Tampico
 Tennessee – named after the state of Tennessee
 Tioga – The name "Tioga" means "at the forks". The various Iroquois tribes all had similar words for the concept: the Oneida called it Te-ah-o-ge, the Mohawk called it Te-yo-ge-ga, the Cayuga called it Da-o-ga and the Seneca called it Da-yo-o-geh.
 Tiskilwa
 Toluca
 Tonica – named after the Tunica people
 Topeka
 Towanda – named after Towanda, Pennsylvania; the name means "burial ground" in the Algonquian language.
 Tuscola
 Tuscarora
 Walla Walla – name means "many waters"
 Wapella
 Wataga
 Watseka – Incorporated in 1865, the name "Watseka" derives from the Potawatomi name "Watch-e-kee", "Daughter of the Evening Star", the wife of early eastern Illinois settler Gurdon Saltonstall Hubbard.
 Wauconda – Originally spelled "Wakanda"
 Waukegan – meaning "little fort"; cf. Potawatomi wakaigin "fort" or "fortress"
 Wauponsee – named for a Potawatomi Chief whose name means “Bright Place in the Sky”
 Wenona
 Wenonah
 Winnetka – name is believed to originate from the Potawatomi language, meaning "beautiful place"
 Wyoming – named after the Wyoming Valley in Pennsylvania which derives from the Lenape Munsee name xwé:wamənk, meaning "at the smaller river hills."

Lakes and rivers

 Illinois River
 Kaskaskia River - It was named after a clan of the Illiniwek
 Kishwaukee River and South Branch Kishwaukee River – derived from the Potowatomi word meaning the "river of the sycamore."
 Lake Michigan
 Mississippi River
 Pecatonica River – The word Pecatonica is an anglicization of two Algonquian language words; Bekaa (or Pekaa in some dialects), which means slow and niba, which means water; forming the conjunction Bekaaniba or Slow Water.
 Piscasaw Creek
 Pistakee Lake – "pistakee" comes from the Algonquin word for buffalo
 Sinsinawa River – One version holds that "Sinsinawa" derives from an Algonquian word (possibly Potawatomi, Fox or Menominee language) for "rattlesnake" to describe the Sioux. Another version says "home of the young eagle".
 Somonauk Creek
 Waukegan River – meaning "little fort"; cf. Potawatomi wakaigin "fort" or "fortress"

Protected areas

 Channahon State Park
 Chautauqua National Wildlife Refuge
 Emiquon National Wildlife Refuge
 Hackmatack National Wildlife Refuge – The name Hackmatack is an Algonquin term for the American tamarack or Larix laricina, a conifer formerly abundant in regional wetlands.
 Illinois Caverns State Natural Area
 Johnson-Sauk Trail State Recreation Area
 Kickapoo State Recreation Area
 Kishwaukee River State Fish and Wildlife Area
 Midewin National Tallgrass Prairie – The name Midewin (/mɪˈdeɪwɪn/, mi-DAY-win) is a Potawatomi word referring to the tribe's healers.
 Mississippi River State Fish and Wildlife Area
 Sangchris Lake State Recreation Area
 Shabbona Lake State Park
 Saganashkee Slough – It was formerly a huge swamp that extended from west of 104th Avenue to the limits of Blue Island, and its original name, Ausaganashkee, is a Potawatomi Indian word that means "slush of the earth," wrote former Forest Preserve District general superintendent Cap Sauer in a historical account written in the late 1940s.

Names from fiction
 Metamora – based on the character in the popular play Metamora; or, The Last of the Wampanoags
 Niota – based on the name of a fictional character in a dime novel, a Native American chief named "Nee-o-tah"

References

Citations

Sources

 Bright, William (2004). Native American Placenames of the United States. Norman: University of Oklahoma Press. .

 
History of Illinois
Place names
Native American history of Illinois